The Burundian Ambassador to China is the official representative of the Government of Burundi to the Government of the People's Republic of China, he is concurrently accredited to governments in Hanoi, Pyongyang, Seoul and Bangkok.

History 
 On December 21, 1963 Mao Zedong and Mwambutsa IV Bangiriceng of Burundi established diplomatic relations.
 In February 1965 Mwambutsa IV Bangiriceng of Burundi broke diplomatic relations with the government in Beijing.
 On October 31, 1971 Michel Micombero restored the diplomatic relations.

List of representatives

References 

Ambassadors of Burundi to China
China
Burundi